Words with Gods is a 2014 Mexican-U.S. anthology film. It is the first of a planned series of such films, collectively titled Heartbeat of the World. Words with Gods consists of segments directed by nine directors. It was screened out of competition at the 71st Venice International Film Festival. Words with Gods follows the theme of religion, specifically as it relates to an individual's relationship with his/her god or gods. The order of the film segments was curated by Nobel Prize winner Mario Vargas Llosa.

References

External links
 
 

2014 films
2014 drama films
Mexican anthology films
American anthology films
Films directed by Emir Kusturica
Films directed by Amos Gitai
Films directed by Mira Nair
Films directed by Héctor Babenco
Films directed by Hideo Nakata
Films directed by Álex de la Iglesia
Films scored by Lorne Balfe
Films scored by Peter Gabriel
Films with screenplays by Jorge Guerricaechevarría
2010s Mexican films